George Adam Clare,  (June 6, 1854 – January 9, 1915) was a businessman, manufacturer and politician based in Preston, Ontario, Canada (now part of Cambridge, Ontario).

He was born in Preston to John Clare and Margaret Beck. In 1875, he went to work at his father's foundry eventually purchasing the enterprise in partnership with his brother and another associate upon his father's retirement in 1881. The business was incorporated in 1901 as Clare Bros. Co. Ltd., with George Clare as its president.

In 1876, he married Catherine Fink.

Clare also headed a number of other companies such as Galt Stove and Furnace, Clare and Clare and Brodest Ltd. of Winnipeg, Solid Leather Shoe Co. Ltd, Preston Car and Coach Co. and Canadian Office and School Furniture Co. Ltd.

Clare was elected to the Preston town council in 1883 and became reeve of Preston in 1886 serving for two years. He assumed this position again from 1891 to 1898.

When Preston was incorporated as a town in 1900 he became its first mayor. He also served as warden of Waterloo County in 1895.

Clare was also active in federal politics running as the Conservative Party's candidate in Waterloo South on several occasions. He was defeated by James Livingston in the 1891 and 1896 federal elections before winning a seat in the House of Commons of Canada in the 1900 election. He served as a Member of Parliament until his death in 1915 and was named to the Queen's Privy Council of Canada in 1913, a rare honour for someone not in Cabinet. Clare died in Preston.

He was inducted to the City of Cambridge Hall of Fame in 2005.

Electoral record

References

External links
 
 Cambridge Hall of Fame biography

1854 births
1915 deaths
Conservative Party of Canada (1867–1942) MPs
Members of the House of Commons of Canada from Ontario
Members of the King's Privy Council for Canada
Mayors of places in Ontario